The year 1947 in architecture involved some significant events.

Events
 February–June – Initial proposals for the Headquarters of the United Nations in New York City are drawn up.
 April – Initial proposals for Point Park Civic Center in Pittsburgh by Frank Lloyd Wright are presented.
 Bankside Power Station, London, designed by Sir Giles Gilbert Scott (completed in early 1960s; converted to Tate Modern art gallery in late 1990s).
 Le Corbusier commences construction of the Cité radieuse, Marseille.
 Reconstruction plan for the French city of Nantes by Michel Roux-Spitz is approved.
 Jože Plečnik proposes plans for the "Plečnik Parliament" overlooking Ljubljana.

Buildings and structures

Buildings completed
 The Berkeley Building, or "Old" John Hancock Tower in Boston, Massachusetts, United States, designed by Cram and Ferguson.
 75 Rockefeller Plaza in New York City.
 Altino Arantes Building in São Paulo, Brazil, designed by Plínio Botelho do Amaral with the contractors, Camargo & Mesquita.
 Wachovia Building (Mobile), Alabama, designed by Platt Roberts & Associates.
 Nizami Mausoleum, Ganja, Azerbaijan (replaced 1991).
 Cathedral of San Carlos de Bariloche, Argentina, designed by Alejandro Bustillo.
 St. Josaphat Cathedral, McCauley, Edmonton, Alberta, designed by Reverend Philip Ruh.
 Zushi Temple, New Taipei City, Taiwan, designed by Li Meishu.
 Avenel Cooperative Housing Project in Los Angeles, California, designed by Gregory Ain.
 Hearst Castle, California, designed by Julia Morgan (construction, begun in 1919, ceases).
 Delano hotel, Miami Beach, designed by Robert Swartburg.

Awards
 AIA Gold Medal – Eliel Saarinen
 RIBA Royal Gold Medal – Albert Edward Richardson

Births
 March 8 – Foad Rafii, Iranian architect working in Canada
 March 22 – George Ferguson, English architect and politician working in Bristol
 April 20 – Mark Fisher, English architect specialising in rock music stage sets (died 2013)
 June 24 – Ian Ritchie, English architect working internationally
 November 10 – Patrick Berger, French architect
 December 9 – Steven Holl, American architect
 December 12 – Will Alsop, English architect (died 2018)
 December 21 – Jacques Lucan, French architect
 Aykut Karaman, Turkish architect

Deaths
 January 22 – Max Berg, German architect (born 1870)
 February 21 – Richard Barry Parker, English architect and urban planner (born 1867)
 April 1 – Carl Krayl, German architect (born 1890)
 June 6 – José Marques da Silva, Portuguese architect (born 1869)
 August 5 – Charles Bateman, English architect (born 1863)
 September 9 – Victor Horta, Belgian architect (born 1861)
 October 1 – James Gamble Rogers, American architect (born 1867)
 November 5 – Fritz Schumacher, German architect (born 1869)
 November 20 – Walter J. Mathews, American architect working in California (born 1850)
 November 28
 James Miller, Scottish architect (born 1860)
 Cecil Wood, New Zealand architect (born 1878)
 Vjekoslav Bastl, Croatian secessionist architect working in Zagreb (born 1872)
 Frank Chouteau Brown, American architect (born 1876)
 Henrietta Cuttino Dozier, American architect working in the southern states (born 1872)
 Squire J. Vickers, American architect working on the New York City Subway (born 1872)
 Francis W. Wilson, American architect working in California (born 1870)

References